Ken Joe Ma'anao Ada (September 28, 1982 – February 18, 2020), often nicknamed Kenjo, was a Guamanian politician, retired merchant marine, and a member of the Republican Party of Guam.

Early life 
On September 28, 1982, Ada was born in Guam.

Education 
Ada earned a Bachelor of Science degree in Public Administration from University of Guam. Ada also earned a Master of Science degree in Public Administration University of Guam.

Career 
Ada held the office of Mayor of Yona, the territory's central village, when he succeeded longtime, Mayor Jose T. "Pedo" Terlaje.

Ada is a former Adjunct professor of public administration at University of Guam.

Arrests

Terrorising
In 2018, Ada was arrested on charges of Terrorizing.

Resisting
In 2020, Ada resisted officers after stopping traffic on Ylig bridge in Yona

Personal life 
Ada's wife is Estelle Ada. They have two sons.
On February 18, 2020, Ada died in Guam. Ada is interred at Guam Windward Memorial in Yona, Guam.

References

1982 births
2020 deaths
Guamanian politicians convicted of crimes
Guamanian Republicans
Mayors of Yona, Guam
People from Yona, Guam